Black Dome may refer to:

Canada 
 Black Dome Mountain, British Columbia

United States